Thomas Derham (died 1444 or 1445) was a Member (MP) of the Parliament of England for Bishop's Lynn in 1406.

References

14th-century births
1445 deaths
English MPs 1406